Tabriz Islamic Art University also known as Tabriz Art University is a public university located in Tabriz, East Azarbaijan. The university's major focus is on the Islamic art and architecture. The university was established in 1997. Part of the university's faculties separated from Sahand University of Technology.

Campus

Khosravi buildings
The main campus of the Tabriz Art University has an area of 36,000 square meters and includes the enrollment office, gymnasium, self-service dining, and library. The campus buildings are parts of an old leather factory that renovated for the university campus.

Behnam House
The other campus is located in Behnam House site. This complex has a history going back to Zand dynasty.

Faculties and Colleges
 Faculty of Architecture and Urban Planning
 Faculty of Multimedia
 Faculty of Islamic Design
 Faculty of Islamic Arts
 Faculty of Applied Arts
 Faculty of Carpet
 Faculty of Heris’s Carpet

See also
Higher education in Iran
List of universities in Iran

References

Educational institutions established in 1997
Public universities
Education in Tabriz
Tabriz, Art University of
1999 establishments in Iran
Buildings and structures in Tabriz
Organisation of Islamic Cooperation
Islamic universities and colleges in Iran